FC Dynamo Odesa is an amateur association football team from Odesa. It is widely believed that the club along with Pishchevik were predecessors of FC Chornomorets Odesa.

Overview
The club was established in 1926 based on local team Sparta Odesa that was created few years earlier in 1923. 

For couple of seasons in 1938–1939 the team was member of the Soviet football championship Group A, the Soviet league's top tier. 

In 1940 the Dynamo Odesa football team was dissolved and its players joined Pishchevik sports society that was recently promoted to the Soviet football championship Group B, the Soviet second tier, from the Ukrainian republican competitions.

Sometime after the World War II FC Dynamo Odesa was revived and continued participate in regional competitions of Odesa Oblast.

Honours
 Group V (predecessor of the Soviet Second League)
 Winners (1): 1937

 Odesa Oblast Football Championship
 Winners (2): 1985, 1986

 Odesa City Football Championship
 Winners (3): 1930, 1934, 1982
 Runners-up (4): 1932, 1933, 1946, 1949

League and Cup history

Soviet Union

Ukraine

See also
 FC Chornomorets Odesa
 :uk:Чемпіонат Одеси з футболу

External links
 Dynamo Odesa
 Odesa clubs
 Dynamo Odesa at the Kicking ball website.
 Evgeni Kazakov. The Soviet First League in football (Первая лига СССР по футболу). History of Soviet championships in football. Volume 1 (1936–1969). Litres, 2019.

Football clubs in Odesa
Amateur football clubs in Ukraine
Soviet Top League clubs
Dynamo sports society
Association football clubs established in 1923
1923 establishments in Ukraine
Police association football clubs in Ukraine
Dynamo (Ukraine)